A lath is a backing material for plaster that is applied to a wood or metal framework as matrix over which stucco or plaster is applied.

Lath may also refer to:

Lath, Rajkot, an Indian village
Lath (horse), a British racehorse
Lath Branch, a stream in Kansas
 Lath, early alternative name of the Brahmi script as used in the Edicts of Ashoka

People with the surname
Melagne Lath (born 1963), Ivorian sprint canoeist
Mukund Lath (1937–2020), Indian scholar and cultural historian
Surendra Lath (b. 1949), Indian politician

See also
Lathe, a machine tool
Lat (disambiguation)